Corbett FC (previously known as the Amenity Sports Academy and the Corbett Tigers) is an Indian professional football club based in Rudrapur, Uttarakhand. The club currently competes in Uttarakhand Super League and has participated in 2021 I-League Qualifiers. It also participates in 2022–23 I-League 2 qualifiers.

History

Founded in 2013 as Amenity Sports Academy under Amenity Public School, the club was later functioning as Odisha FC academy branch, before rebranding as Corbett Tigers. Its 2021 I-League Qualifiers entry has been rather controversial because state association didn't conduct that year's qualifying tournament, directly nominating the club instead.
They began their 2021 I-League Qualifiers journey with a 1–1 draw against ARA FC on 5 October at the Bangalore Football Stadium, eventually finishing group on 4th position.

Kit manufacturers and shirt sponsors

Players

First-team squad

Youth team
Corbett's youth men's team competes in the Hero Youth League. They took part group stages of 2022–23 U-17 Youth Cup as well.

References

Football in India
I-League 2nd Division clubs
2013 establishments in Uttarakhand
Association football clubs established in 2013
Football clubs in Uttarakhand
Uttarakhand Super League